Gregopimpla is a genus of parasitoid wasps belonging to the family Ichneumonidae.

The species of this genus are found in Europe and Northern America.

Species:
 Gregopimpla anjana (Gupta & Tikar, 1976) 
 Gregopimpla bernuthii (Hartig, 1838)

References

Ichneumonidae
Ichneumonidae genera